Timber Creek or Timbercreek may refer to:

Rivers
 Big Timber Creek, a stream in southwestern New Jersey, US
 Timber Creek (Bahamas), a river in the Bahamas
 Timber Creek (South Dakota), a stream

Schools
 Timber Creek High School (Florida), a school in Orlando, Florida, US
 Timber Creek High School (Fort Worth, Texas), a school in Forth Worth, Texas, US
 Timber Creek Regional High School, a school in Erial, New Jersey, US

Settlements
 Timber Creek, Northern Territory, a small town in Australia
 Timber Creek Township, Marshall County, Iowa, a township in Iowa, US
 Timber Creek Township, Nance County, Nebraska, a township in Nebraska, US
 Timbercreek Canyon, Texas, a village in Texas, US

Other uses
 Timbercreek Asset Management, a Canadian real estate company

See also
 Timber Creek Campground Comfort Stations, historic public toilets in Rocky Mountain National Park, US, listed on the NRHP
 Timber Creek Lodge, a 2016 Canadian reality TV show
 Timber Creek Road Camp Barn, a historic barn in Rocky Mountain National Park, US, formerly listed on the NRHP
 Timber Creek Review, a literary journal